The northern scrub flycatcher (Sublegatus arenarum) is a species of bird in the family Tyrannidae.
It is found in Aruba, Brazil, Colombia, Costa Rica, French Guiana, Guyana, Netherlands Antilles, Panama, Suriname, Trinidad and Tobago, and Venezuela.
Its natural habitats are subtropical or tropical dry forest, subtropical or tropical moist lowland forest, subtropical or tropical mangrove forest, and subtropical or tropical dry shrubland.

References

Sublegatus
Birds described in 1863
Taxa named by Osbert Salvin
Taxonomy articles created by Polbot